Laffan is the surname of:

 May Laffan (1845–1916), writer, a pioneer of "slum fiction" in Ireland 
 Joseph de Courcy Laffan (1786–1848), Irish physician 
 William M. Laffan (1848–1909), publisher and editor of the New York Sun
 Robert Laffan (politician) (1821–1882), officer in the Royal Engineers, Governor of Bermuda 
 Patricia Laffan (1919–2014), English actress 
 Kevin Laffan (1922–2003), English playwright 
 Robert Laffan (c.1794–1833), Archbishop of Cashal and Emly in Ireland 
 Gary Laffan (born 1975), Irish hurler

See also 
 16085 Laffan, a main-belt asteroid